The 1874 Dublin University by-election was held on 16 March 1874. The by-election was held due to the incumbent Conservative MP, John Thomas Ball, becoming Attorney General for Ireland. It was retained by the incumbent.

References

1874 elections in the United Kingdom
March 1874 events
By-elections to the Parliament of the United Kingdom in Dublin University
Unopposed ministerial by-elections to the Parliament of the United Kingdom (need citation)
1874 elections in Ireland